Cristina Urgel García (born 5 April 1979) is a Spanish television actress and presenter, known for her role as Patricia O’Farrell in La Reina del Sur.

 Biography 
Cristina Urgel García was born on 5 April 1979 in Soria, although she was raised in Logroño (in the neighbouring region of La Rioja), studying at the IES Mateo Sagasta. She ran as candidate of Soria at Miss Spain 1997, when she was 17 years old. She earned a licentiate degree in Law from the University of La Rioja and then moved to Madrid to train as actress at the Alicia Hermida's La Barraca School.

She also worked as TV presenter for MTV Spain (2004 and 2005), El Grand Prix del verano (2005), Adivina quién viene a cenar, and as collaborator for La Sexta's Sé lo que hicisteis... (2009) and Cuatro's  (2009–2010).

In 2011 she starred in La Reina del Sur playing Patricia O'Farrell, an aristocratic, cultured, educated and bisexual woman friend of the leading character Teresa Mendoza. She also appeared in Bandolera and Ciega a citas. After playing a small role in two episodes of La que se avecina in 2014, Urgel took some years off from acting.

She returned to fiction in 2020, as she joined the cast of El secreto de Puente Viejo''.

Filmography 

Television

References 

Spanish women television presenters
Spanish television actresses
21st-century Spanish actresses
1979 births
Living people